Nomada ruficornis  is a Palearctic species of nomad bee.

References

External links
Images representing  Nomada ruficornis 

Hymenoptera of Europe
Nomadinae
Bees described in 1758
Taxa named by Carl Linnaeus